Lottery Winner (foaled March 19, 1989) is an American Thoroughbred racehorse who won the 1993  Goodwood Breeders' Cup Handicap.

Career

His first race was at Santa Anita Park on November 11, 1991, where he came in 9th place.

The horse did not see victory until August 22, 1992 at  Del Mar, which started a streak where he won 3 races in a row.

The highlight of his career took place on October 17, 1993, when he won the 1993  Goodwood Breeders' Cup Handicap.

The last win of his career took place on April 24, 1994 at the 1994 Bates Motel Handicap at Santa Anita Park.

The horse's last race was at  Del Mar on August 16, 1995, where he finished 4th.

Pedigree

References

1989 racehorse births
Racehorses bred in Kentucky
Racehorses trained in the United States
Thoroughbred family 16-g